City of Walla Walla v. Walla Walla Water Company, 172 U.S. 1 (1898), was a United States Supreme Court case in which the Walla Walla Water Company filed a bill to stop the City of Walla Walla from erecting waterworks, acquiring property to erect waterworks, or using city money to build waterworks.

References

External links
 

United States Supreme Court cases
United States Supreme Court cases of the Fuller Court
1898 in United States case law
Walla Walla, Washington
Public utilities of the United States